Ian Hogarth is the co-founder and chairman of Songkick.

Hogarth studied Artificial Intelligence at the University of Cambridge.

Songkick 

Hogarth founded live music startup Songkick with friends Michelle You and Pete Smith in 2007. Smith and Hogarth met at Cambridge, Hogarth and You met in Beijing; they shared a love of live music and formed Songkick, which was part of the 2007 Y Combinator program in Boston. They chose to set up the company in London because it "is the gig capital of the world. London has more concerts than anywhere else."

Hogarth and his fellow Songkick co-founders were named to Inc. magazine's 30-under-30 list in 2010; the same year, Hogarth won the British Council’s UK Young Music Entrepreneur of the Year award. He was also named as one of Forbes magazine's 2012 music 30-under-30.

In 2013, Songkick launched Detour, a crowdfunding platform for concerts.

In June 2015, Songkick announced its merger with direct ticket vendor CrowdSurge and a $16.6m Series C investment round. Hogarth became co-CEO of the combined company, alongside Matt Jones the former CrowdSurge CEO.

Silicon Milkroundabout 

In 2010, Hogarth and Songkick COO Pete Smith founded Silicon Milkroundabout, a career fair for high tech startups in East London.

References 

Year of birth missing (living people)
Living people
British company founders
Alumni of the University of Cambridge